Illahee State Park is an  Washington state park located in the hamlet of Illahee, just north of East Bremerton, on Port Orchard Bay, part of Puget Sound. The word "Illahee" means earth or country in the Native language Chinuk Wawa. The park was established when Kitsap County donated 13 acres to the state in 1934. The park's old-growth stand is home to one of the nation's oldest Pacific yews, which has been standing for approximately 400 years. Park activities include picnicking, camping, hiking, boating, and shellfish harvesting.

Shellfish harvesting status 
The official shellfish harvesting status of Illahee State Park is maintained by the Washington State Department of Health. In addition, environmental contaminants of the surface-water and Mytilus tissues at Illahee State Park are monitored routinely by local ecology programs. While historical monitoring has reported low concentrations of heavy metals over the past decade (2010-2020), the presence of carcinogenic polycyclic aromatic hydrocarbons (cPAHs) in Mytilus tissues should be considered by recreational and subsistence consumers. PAH concentrations in Puget Sound have been highlighted by the National Oceanic and Atmospheric Administration as being the highest in the nation and cPAH regulatory thresholds for Washington State consumers have been calculated by the Washington State Department of Ecology. The following table provides Washington State cPAH thresholds (current as of 2020) for general fish consumption and available historical tissue burdens at Illahee State Park.

References

External links

Illahee State Park Washington State Parks and Recreation Commission
Illahee State Park Map Washington State Parks and Recreation Commission

Parks in Kitsap County, Washington
State parks of Washington (state)
Protected areas established in 1934